Osvaldo "Ozzie" Martínez (born May 7, 1988) is a Puerto Rican professional baseball shortstop who is a free agent. He played in Major League Baseball (MLB) for the Florida Marlins.

Career

Florida Marlins
Martínez was drafted by the Florida Marlins in the 11th round of the 2006 Major League Baseball draft out of Porterville College. He was called up to the Majors for the first time on September 19, 2010, walking in his one at-bat as a pinch hitter. The following day, he started at shortstop for the Marlins against the St. Louis Cardinals and recorded his first hit, a single to center field off Chris Carpenter. He appeared in 14 games for the Marlins in 2010 and another 20 in 2011, with a combined batting average of .258.

Chicago White Sox
Martínez and Jhan Mariñez were sent to the Chicago White Sox on September 29, 2011 as compensation for the hiring of Ozzie Guillén by the Marlins, as Guillen had one year remaining on his contract with the White Sox.

Los Angeles Dodgers
On July 10, 2012, Martínez was traded to the Los Angeles Dodgers for cash considerations. With the AAA Albuquerque Isotopes, he played in 39 games and hit .255.

On November 23, 2012, he was resigned to the Los Angeles Dodgers on a minor league deal, with an invitation to spring training. He split the season between Albuquerque and AA Chattanooga and hit .247 in 89 games.

Atlanta Braves
On May 18, 2014, Martínez was traded to the Atlanta Braves, who assigned him to the Gwinnett Braves.

Baltimore Orioles
Martínez signed with the Baltimore Orioles as a minor league free agent in November 2014. He re-signed with the team after the 2015 season. He became a free agent after the 2016 season.

Sugar Land Skeeters
On March 7, 2017, Martínez signed with the Sugar Land Skeeters of the Atlantic League of Professional Baseball.

Chicago Cubs
On April 4, 2017, Martínez signed a minor league deal with the Chicago Cubs. He elected free agency on November 6, 2017.

Road Warriors
Martínez signed with the Road Warriors of the Atlantic League of Professional Baseball for the 2018 season. He was released on July 9, 2018. Martinez re-signed with the team on August 2, 2018. He became a free agent following the 2018 season.  In 105 games he hit .256/.307/.347 with 7 homeruns and 27 RBIs.

New Britain Bees
On March 5, 2019, Martínez signed with the New Britain Bees of the Atlantic League of Professional Baseball. He became a free agent following the 2019 season. In 103 games he hit .227/.293/.298 with 3 home runs and 27 RBIs.

Cleburne Railroaders
On February 24, 2021, Martínez signed with the Cleburne Railroaders of the American Association of Professional Baseball. He was released on December 2, 2021. In 89 games he hit .315/.368/.487 with 14 home runs and 56 RBIs.

Sioux Falls Canaries
On May 21, 2022, Martínez signed with the Sioux Falls Canaries of the American Association of Professional Baseball. In 86 games he hit .271/.341/.356 with 6 home runs and 35 RBI. He was named an All-Star for Sioux Falls in 2022. He was released on September 13, 2022.

References

External links

1988 births
Living people
Major League Baseball players from Puerto Rico
Major League Baseball shortstops
Baseball players at the 2019 Pan American Games
Pan American Games gold medalists for Puerto Rico
Pan American Games medalists in baseball
Florida Marlins players
Jacksonville Suns players
Gulf Coast Marlins players
Jupiter Hammerheads players
Jamestown Jammers players
Greensboro Grasshoppers players
New Britain Bees players
New Orleans Zephyrs players
Charlotte Knights players
Albuquerque Isotopes players
Chattanooga Lookouts players
Gwinnett Braves players
Criollos de Caguas players
People from Carolina, Puerto Rico
Phoenix Desert Dogs players
Gigantes de Carolina players
Bowie Baysox players
Norfolk Tides players
Iowa Cubs players
Atenienses de Manatí (baseball) players
Medalists at the 2019 Pan American Games
Liga de Béisbol Profesional Roberto Clemente infielders
Sioux Falls Canaries players
Cleburne Railroaders players